Rodrigo Lopresti also known as The Hermitt is an American musician, rapper, and songwriter from Brooklyn, New York, United States. His first commercial album was released in 2003.

History 
Rodrigo Lopresti built a recording studio in a tiny windowless closet of a Brooklyn apartment he shared with Francis Benhamou. Lopresti recorded, arranged and mastered 14 songs into a Korg digital 8-track device. In 2003, "& The Story of The Insects" was born. He released the album under Devious Semantics, a record label he co-founded with Kevin Brady and Tyler Fenio.

Lopresti played most of the instruments on the album and designed the cover artwork. Ryan Donowho played drums on "& Calistos Curse." and Patrick Galligan on “I-Mold”, “A Pointless Ride”, “The Man Behind The Mask”, and “El Rostro Impenetrable”.

Gus Van Sant featured two songs, "Seen as None," and "Pointless Ride," on the soundtrack for his 2005 movie "Last Days." The Hermitt band, featuring Kevin Brady on bass and Patrick Galligan on drums, was the band playing at a bar in the Last Days movie.

The band has not performed live since 2008.

Discography 
 The Alchis EP
 Sessions in Pagoda EP
 The Hermitt & the Story of the Insects LP

References

External links 
 Review of The Hermitt "& The Story of The Insects." with downloadable samples of their songs"
 Last.fm

Musicians from Brooklyn